Palmer Eddy Pierce (October 23, 1865 – January 17, 1940) was a United States Army brigadier general who commanded the 54th Infantry Regiment on the Western Front of World War I. He was the first president of the National Collegiate Athletic Association (NCAA).

Early life and education 
Palmer E. Pierce was born in Savanna, Illinois, to Henry C. Pierce and Laura Shepard. He was the second of three brothers. He grew up in Traer, Iowa, going on to attend Grinnell College and the US Military Academy at West Point, New York. He received his lieutenant's commission in 1891. He became athletic director at West Point for a short time in the early 1890s, managing the first Army football team.

Early service 
Pierce first served in the Spanish–American War of 1898 during the Invasion of Cuba, Puerto Rico, and the resurrection of the Philippines. He served during the Boxer Rebellion in 1899. In 1901 he graduated from the Army War College and the school of the line and the staff class at Fort Leavenworth.

Pierce was the first president of the NCAA, taking office in 1906. At the first organizational meeting in December 1905, he emphasized the importance of "home rule", which allowed any institutions that joined the NCAA to still keep their independence. He was a severe critic of the "old" rules committee, saying that they were "a self-constituted, self-perpetuating and irresponsible body, which, in order to make the rules more favorable to the playing area available at particular institutions, had degraded a once noble sport to a brutal gladitorial contest".

He served in the Villa Expedition in 1916.

Service 

In 1917, Pierce became an aide to United States Secretary of War Newton D. Baker. On one occasion after the declaration of war, when Pierce appeared before the Senate Finance Committee to discuss how to spend the three billion dollars requested to send to the War Department, he declared: "Clothing, cots, camps, food, pay … And we may have to have an army in France!". "Good Lord!" said Virginian Senator Thomas S. Martin. "You're not going to send soldiers over there, are you?" Pierce became the Director of Purchases for the War Industries Board after its establishment in 1917.

In the later half of 1917 to the early part of 1918, Pierce served as commander of the 27th Infantry Division and the 54th Infantry Brigade. While he was under British command, he was ordered to the Battle of Bellecourt; there the Australians provided invaluable supplies and lessons, including hot meals to the front lines, given the lack of supplies on the front line. In late 1918, he became the Assistant Chief of Staff of the AEF. He was promoted to brigadier general and earned two Army Distinguished Service Medal and the British Order of the Bath for his actions as the commander of the respective formations. The citation for his Army DSM reads:

Death and legacy 
After retiring from the Army, Pierce became an assistant to the President of the Standard Oil Company. He died in New York City on January 17, 1940.

His widow, Agnes Young Pierce (1870-1961), left a bequest of $1 million to the Association of Graduates of West Point, which was used to establish the Palmer E. Pierce Memorial Fund.

References

Bibliography

External links

Palmer E Pierce - United States Census, 1930

1865 births
1940 deaths
People from Savanna, Illinois
United States Army generals of World War I
United States Army generals
United States Military Academy alumni
Recipients of the Distinguished Service Medal (US Army)
Military personnel from Illinois
United States Army War College alumni